Pueblo Libre (originally called La Magdalena or Old Magdalena to differentiate it from Magdalena del Mar District) is a district of the Lima Province in Peru. Its name, which means Free Town or Free People, was granted by José de San Martín on April 10, 1822, as a recognition of the patriotism shown by its inhabitants during the Peruvian War of Independence. The district was created by law 9162 on November 5, 1940.
Pueblo Libre is a middle-class residential community and has the most parks in Lima, although it has several branches of banks, local private universities and major corporations.

Background and Landmarks
Pueblo Libre was founded in 1557 as Magdalena Vieja, before being renamed Free Town (Pueblo Libre in Spanish) in 1821 by José de San Martín.  The name was given because of the great patriotism and desire for freedom San Martin saw from the people. Simón Bolívar, one of the liberators of South America, lived in Pueblo Libre. His colonial mansion is known today as the Palacio de la Magdalena, which houses the National Museum of Archaeology, Anthropology and History of Peru, having formerly housed the Magdalena government of Peru during the War of the Pacific. The Museum, also known by its initials MNAAHP, has collections of artifacts from Peruvian culture. It is one of the most visited museums in Lima and it is located at the heart of the district. Pueblo Libre has a rich history - museums, famous restaurants, and art galleries which are located in this district of Lima.

One of Pueblo Libre's oldest attractions is La Cruz del Viajero (The Cross of the Traveler). The cross was a symbol of faith and protection the conquistadores brought from Spain. Francisco Pizarro placed the cross in Pueblo Libre; soldiers would pray before going to war or when making a hard distant journey.

Pueblo Libre is not short of places to eat great Creole food. One restaurant, El Bolivariano, is popular among local families and famous for its weekend buffets, while the historic Antigua Taberna Queirolo, owned by the Santiago Queirolo pisco makers, serves one of the best authentic food and wine in Lima.

Situated not a long walk from Pueblo Libre's pleasant plaza is the Museo Larco Hererra, which houses the largest collection of Moche artifacts in the country. This museum is known for having one of the best pre-Columbian exhibits in the world. It offers incredible Paracas textiles and a huge collection of pottery.  In the history section of the museum,  it documents of the brutality of the Spaniards in the country and of the challenges it has faced since its independence.

Geography
The district has a total land area of 4.38 km2. Its administrative center is located 90 meters above sea level.

Boundaries
 North: Lima District and Breña District
 East: Jesús María District
 South: Magdalena del Mar District
 West: San Miguel District

Demographics
According to the Census 2017 by the INEI, the district has 83,323 inhabitants.

See also 
 Administrative divisions of Peru

References

External links 
 

Districts of Lima